The signs prayer is one of the Muslim prayers that may be optional or mandatory depending on the specif conditions and the school of jurisprudence. When solar or lunar eclipses, earthquakes, thunder, or other natural phenomena (or signs, hence the name signs prayer) happen, Muslims may have to pray Ṣalāt al-ʾĀyāt. In Twelver Shia Islam, al-Ayat Prayer consists of two Rakats, and there are five Ruku in each. It is for specific conditions and have been described in detail in resalah of marja's.

Title
Ayat in Arabic term means sign. This prayer was named al-Ayat (the sign), because when Solar eclipse or Lunar eclipse or other cases is happened, the signs of Allah's power appears for the people.

Background

In the past, some people were superstitious minds of the occurrence of natural disasters. For example, when Ibrahim, the son of Prophet died, the solar eclipse occurred. People thought that the  solar eclipse happened because of the death of the son of the Prophet. 
There is narration about it. When the prophet was informed of these words, he went pulpit and said: “Oh people! Surely the sun and moon are signs of Allah that are moving by Verdict of Allah.  Lunar eclipse or Solar eclipse does not occur by the birth or death of any person. So that when one of them or both is happened, pray Salat al-Ayat.” And the prophet pray Salat al-Ayat with people. Since then, the Salat al-Ayat prayer were obligatory on Muslims. 
Ja’far al-Sadiq narrated that his father said: “Earthquakes, solar and lunar eclipses, strong and dreadful winds, are among the signs of the Day of Resurrection. Whenever you happen to witness them, think of the Day of Resurrection, seek refuge in mosques, and stand in prayer.

The necessity of salat al-Ayat 
On practical laws that salat al-ayat is obligatory upon the occurrence of the following phenomena: 
Solar eclipse and Lunar eclipse: Even if the sun or the moon are eclipsed only partially and the phenomenon does not create fear in any person.
Earthquakes: Even if none becomes afraid of it. 
Thunder and lightning, and black and red winds that frighten most people.

Manner of performing

Shia Islam

Twelver
Al-Ayat Prayers consists of two Rakats, and there are five Ruku in each. In following they have been explained

Method 1
After making niyyah of offering the prayers, one should say takbir (Allahu Akbar) and
recite Surah al-fatiha and another Surah, and then perform the Ruku.
 Thereafter, he should stand and recite Surah al-fatiha and a Surah and then perform
another Ruku.
 He should repeat this action five times, and, when he stands after the fifth Ruku, he
should perform two Sujud.
 Then he should stand up to perform the second Rakat in the same manner as he has
done in the first.
 Then he should recite Tashahhud and Salam.

Method 2
 After making niyyah to offer al-Ayat Prayers, a person is allowed to say takbir and
recite Surah al-Fatiha and then divide the verses of the other Surah into five parts, and
recite one verse or more or less and thereafter perform the Ruku.
 He should then stand up and recite another part of the Surah (without reciting Surah al-Fatiha)
and then perform another Ruku. He should repeat this action, and finish
that Surah before performing the fifth Ruku.

See also
Salat
Asr prayer
Maghrib prayer
Isha prayer

References

Salah
Salah terminology